The Pathans of Bihar in India are descendants of various Pashtun settlers in Bihar. The Pathan population of Bihar belong to eleven sub-groups, the main ones being the Suri, Sherwani, Yousafzai,Ahmed,Durrani, Bangash, Afridi, Khattak, Bettani, Lodhi, Tanoli, Orakzai and Ghori. These Pashtun people are known as Pathan in the Hindustani language. Another common name for the community is Khan, which also a common surname. Rajputs who have become Muslims also use Khan as a surname and this may create confusion which further convulate their numbers.

They are said to have settled in the region from the 13th century CE onward. In addition, they have a powerful social status among the Muslims of the state. 

Lohani Pashtuns ruled a princely state within Bihar. Sher Shah Suri who founded Suri dynasty was born in Rohtas district.

Present Circumstances
There's an exclusivist and superior sense of tribalism in some erstwhile landowner families, even though those are now involved in small farming and are endogamous (tend to marry close kin). They practice both parallel cousin and cross-cousin marriages. Most of them still marry in their own ethnicity and called themselves pure Pathan and distinguish themselves from the Pathans who have intermarried into local Muslim communities. They speak the Urdu language as their daily form of communication. Most of the Pathans have settled in villages, some in cities or recently moved from villages to cities. Some of them were big landowners who still have good lands and they cultivate them. Part of them are also in Police department or in other government jobs.

Most of them are settled in Gaya district,BAZU KALAN VILLAGE Darbhanga district, East Champaran district, Sitamarhi district, Samastipur district, Begusarai district and few in other districts of Bihar.

References

Muslim communities of Bihar
Bihar